Lemina is a torrent in Piedmont, north-western Italy.

Geography 

Lemina source is at 1,382 m above sea level at Monte Faiè, a peak of Monte Freidour  in the central Cottian Alps, at the boundary between the communal territories of Pinerolo and San Pietro Val Lemina. It flows for some 46 km, until entering the Chisola near the communes of La Loggia and Vinovo, some kilometers east to Turin.

References 

Rivers of Italy
Rivers of the Province of Turin
Rivers of the Alps